The River Lee is a river in County Cork, Ireland.

River Lee or similar names (including homophones) may also refer to:

Rivers
 Lea River, Tasmania, Australia
 Lee (Vechte), Lower Saxony, Germany
 Lee Creek (Ohio River tributary), West Virginia, United States
 Lees River, Massachusetts, United States
 Leigh River (Victoria), Australia
 River Lea, south-east England
 Lee Navigation, part of the south-east England river
 River Lee Diversion, part of the south-east England river
 River Lee (Kerry), Ireland, flows through Tralee

Settlements
 Riverlea, Ohio, a small United States city
 Riverlea, New Zealand, a suburb of Hamilton
 Riverlea, a township in Florida, Gauteng, South Africa

Other
 River Lea (song) (2015), by Adele